Muhammad Shoaib (1907 – 13 May 1976) was the Finance Minister of Pakistan for eight years (15 November 1958 – 8 June 1962 and 15 December 1962 – 23 March 1965) during General Ayub Khan's regime.

Early life and career
He was born in 1907 at Amilo, Azamgarh, Uttar Pradesh, British India. He was married to Iffat Ara. He has  a daughter named Nafis Sadik, who has a long distinguished career track record with the United Nations in the area of 'Family Planning and World Population control'.

Muhammad Shoaib is widely criticized for disapproving the Pakistan Atomic Energy Commission's agreement with General Electric of Canada to build a 137 MW Nuclear power plant in Pakistan. Munir Ahmad Khan (then IAEA scientist) urged him for support but his diplomatic decisions created serious delay in Nuclear technology development of the country.

He resigned his position on 23 March 1965 as Finance Minister to join the World Bank as an advisor. He was associated with the World Bank for 20 years and had retired in 1975.

Death
Muhammad Shoaib died at his home near Washington, D. C. on 13 May 1976 at age 70.

See also 
 Nafis Sadik (United Nations Under-Secretary-General) (late Muhammad Shoaib's daughter)

References

1907 births
1976 deaths
Finance Ministers of Pakistan
Pakistani financiers
Muhajir people